The NATO B band is the obsolete designation given to the radio frequencies from 250 to 500 MHz (equivalent to wavelengths between 1.20 and 0.60 m) during the cold war period. Since 1992 frequency allocations, allotment and assignments are in line to NATO Joint Civil/Military Frequency Agreement (NJFA).

However, in order to identify military radio spectrum requirements, e.g. for crises management planning, training, Electronic warfare activities, or in military operations, this system is still in use.

Particularities 
The NATO harmonised UHF band 225-400 MHz is also a subset of this particular band as defined by the NJFA.

References

Radio spectrum